Carolina Courage was a professional soccer team that played in the Women's United Soccer Association. The team played at Fetzer Field on the UNC-Chapel Hill campus in 2001, and then at the soccer-specific SAS Stadium in Cary, North Carolina in 2002 and 2003.

History
The team was founded in 2000 and began play in 2001. After finishing the 2001 season in last place, the Carolina Courage won the 2002 Founders Cup, defeating the Washington Freedom 3–2.    In 2003, the Carolina Courage finished 7th in the league with seven wins, nine losses, and four ties.

The Women's United Soccer Association announced on September 15, 2003, that it was suspending operations.

Players

2003 Roster

Coach: Jay Entlich
Assistant Coach: Susan Hill
Assistant Coach: Scott Calabrese

See also

 Women's professional sports
 List of soccer clubs in the United States
 Women's association football

References

External links
 Archive.org: Carolina Courage Website on September 30, 2003
Carolina Courage profile

 
Sports in Raleigh-Durham
Defunct soccer clubs in North Carolina
Women's soccer clubs in North Carolina
Women's United Soccer Association teams
2000 establishments in North Carolina
2003 disestablishments in North Carolina
Association football clubs established in 2000
Association football clubs disestablished in 2003